Ganquan Subdistrict is a subdistrict in Hanjiang District, Yangzhou, Jiangsu, China. , it administers Ganquan Residential Community and the following nine villages: 
Xiangxiang Village
Changtang Village
Yaowan Village
Wuhu Village
Laoshan Village
Shuangshan Village
Jiaoxiang Village
Gongluji Village
Shuangtang Village

See also 
 List of township-level divisions of Jiangsu

References 

Township-level divisions of Jiangsu
Hanjiang District, Yangzhou